Trichofolliculoma is a cutaneous condition characterized by a benign, highly structured tumor of the pilosebaceous unit. Trichofolliculoma is a rare tumor of the eyelid. It can be suspected by the “cotton bag sign”

See also 
 Multiple familial trichoepithelioma
 Pilomatricoma
 Skin lesion
 List of cutaneous conditions

References 

Andrés Germán Alza y Ricardo Drut, “Tricofoliculoma palpebral: signo de la bolsa de algodón,” Oftalmología Clínica y Experimental, consulta 19 de enero de 2023, https://oftalmologos.org.ar/oce_anteriores/items/show/124.

External links 

Epidermal nevi, neoplasms, and cysts